Lambeau may refer to

 Curly Lambeau (1898–1965), founder, player, and first coach of the Green Bay Packers football team
 Lambeau Field, outdoor athletic stadium in Green Bay, Wisconsin, named for Curly
 Lambeau, Tobago, village in Trinidad and Tobago